Cetus can refer to:
 The constellation Cetus
 The former biotechnology company Cetus Corporation
 Project Cetus, crewless submarine being developed by the United Kingdom
 Cetus (mythology), the monster sent to devour Andromeda which was slain by Perseus
 "-cetus", a suffix used to describe whales in taxonomy. 
 Cetus, a settlement on Earth in the online game Warframe that hosts the Ostrons, a civilization of human traders